Csodamalom Bábszínház (Magic Mill Puppet Theatre) of Miskolc, Hungary was formed by puppeteer Tibor Korzsény in 1986 as an amateur company.
The name "Csodamalom" (Magic Mill) preserves the name of Fábián Mill, which was the former building of the company since then they had moved to 11, Kossuth Street. The theatre functioned as semi-official since 1988 and as official from 1992. Above the 50 play repertoire there are two or three premiers a year, usually a dramatizing classical folk tales. Uniquely in Hungary, they play musical puppet shows, including the puppet-pantomimes staged for adults, such as Pictures at an Exhibition by Mussorgsky, Bolero by Ravel and Carmina Burana by Orff.

History
During the last fifty years several attempts had been made to form a permanent puppet theatre in the city of Miskolc, which has outstanding theatrical traditions. In 1947 László Bod, later the director of Budapest State Puppet Theatre, tried to establish the genre in Miskolc.

In the middle 1980s, in the building known as Fábián Mill, initially two groups started their work. The first to perform here was the amateur puppetry led by János Czikora until 1989. Beside this group was the Csodamalom Puppet Theatre established in 1986 by Tibor Korzsény, who was a member of the State Puppet Theatre before, and artist of the Tokaj Varieté.

The first performance was on 26 September 1986 under the management of Tibor Korzsényi. It was an adaptation of a tale by the Grimm Brothers entitled Hansel and Gretel.
The artists, including Anna Molnár, Valéria Egerszegi, Aszterisz Pacadisz were members of the Tokaj Varieté, except Ildikó Gyürek.

Following this, Tibor Korzsényi gathered together young people who were interested in the genre. The group enlarged and changed throughout the years. In September, 1990 the higher education of puppeteers was launched with twelve students, under the professional supervision of the State Puppet Theatre.
The first shows' puppets were designed by Vera Bródy, and made in the workshop of the State Puppet Theatre by Emőke Szabó applied artist. Scenery were made in the workshop of the National Theatre of Miskolc under the direction of Attila Veres. Accompanying music was composed by composers of Miskolc, music teacher János Zoller and organist László Csabai.

The group soon grew out of its original location. In 1988 the theatre company, then being the amateur puppetry of the City Cultural Centre, received a group operational permit from the National Philharmony, then from 1992 the company was granted the license to work as professional theatre, and was relocated to the building of the former Studio Theatre in Kossuth Street, where they established their own workshop.

Techniques

In the beginning they carried on the traditions of the State Puppet Theatre playing mainly classic puppet shows for young children.

In recent years the group's professional activities are characterized by variety of techniques and genres. Amongst others the group put up plays based on Roma genesis legends, but their series featuring traditional European fai puppet-show stories, or the stories of Czechoslovakian cartoons formerly being very popular in Hungary have eventually built up a unique repertoire.

Beside hand or glovepuppets they apply several techniques in creating puppets. They make Wayang puppets, and amongst the flat-puppets cut out from paper and installed onto posts, marionettes were used for example in the play, Háry János. Puppets in the King Mátyás tales are moved with a Sicilian marionette technique, while objects transformed into real actors in Rosszcsont Peti (Naughty Peter).

Personnel 
Directors:
Judit Juhász: art director
Erzsébet M.Németh: director
Mária Jákfalvi, Labodáné: financial director

Puppeteers:
Gáspár Zsolt Hajdú
Ildikó Heiszmann, Nívó-Prize puppeteer
Zsolt Klim
Szabolcs Károlyi, puppeteer trainee
Laura Kulcsár, puppeteer trainee
Bernadett Láng
Edit Tar
Gábor Tulipán
Tibor Oláh

Workshop:
Ildikó Juhász, Barnáné: painter, puppet- and set designer
Laczy, Barna: creative co-worker
Iboly Sipos, Barnáné: administrator
Zsolt Méhes: stagecraftician
Zsoltné Dr. Máthé: janitor
Sándorné Mikle: seater
Endre Papp: repairman
Zoltán Polacsek: decorateur
István Szabó:decorateur
Norbert Szarka: decorateur
Lajos Veres: organiser
Lászlóné Vizsolyi: cloakroom attendant
Csba István Újvári: scenic and puppet designer
György Zábrátzky: scene maker

References 

Puppet theaters
Tourist attractions in Miskolc
Culture in Miskolc
Theatre in Hungary